Closed Circuit is a 1978 Italian made-for-television  social science fiction giallo film directed by Giuliano Montaldo. It was entered into the 28th Berlin International Film Festival.

The film concerns the police investigation of the murder of a cinema attendee who is shot dead during a matinée showing of a Spaghetti Western starring Giuliano Gemma.

Cast
 Flavio Bucci - Il sociologo
 Tony Kendall - Roberto Vinci
 Aurore Clément - Gabriella
 William Berger - Il pistolero sfidante
 Giuliano Gemma - Il pistolero
 Luciano Catenacci - Vice-questore
 Giovanni Di Benedetto - Nonno
 Mattia Sbragia - L'adolescente
 Franco Balducci - Aldo Capocci
 Guerrino Crivello - Piccoletto
 Alfredo Pea - Garzone
 Laura D'Angelo - La maschera al cinema

References

External links

1978 films
Giallo films
1970s Italian-language films
Films directed by Giuliano Montaldo
Social science fiction films
1970s Italian films